Aşağı Amburdərə (also, Ashagy Amburdarya, Ashagy Amburdere, and Nizhnyaya Amburdarya) is a village and municipality in the Lerik Rayon of Azerbaijan.  It has a population of 539.  The municipality consists of the villages of Aşağı Amburdərə, Yuxarı Amburdərə, Qışlaq, Xocadoy, and Hilədərə.

References 

Populated places in Lerik District